Ernst Elias Niebergall (13 January 1815 - 19 April 1843) was a comedic German writer and playwright.

Biography
The son of a musician, Niebergall studied Theology at Gießen. He was involved in the student league Germania where he met Georg Büchner. After the banning of this organization and resulting disciplinary action, he was forced to suspend his theology studies. He became a teacher of Latin and Greek at a school in Dieburg and after 1840 in Darmstadt at Schmitzschen Knabeninstitut, a private school.

Datterich
Nieberhall wrote most of his work under the pseudonyms E. Streff or E. St., and sadly his work was not actually performed during his lifetime. His best known work is the play Datterich (1841). Written in Hessian dialect, it tells the story of a drunken and laid-off finance official.
The text of Datterich can be read at gutenberg.de

Other works
Eleven Novellas in the Didaskalia supplement of the Frankfurter Journals (1836-1841)
"Des Burschen Heimkehr oder: Der Tolle Hund" (1837)

1815 births
1843 deaths
German male dramatists and playwrights
19th-century German dramatists and playwrights
19th-century German male writers